Alizé Lim (born 13 July 1990) is an inactive French tennis player. Her career-high WTA singles ranking is world No. 135, which she reached on 26 May 2014. Her career-high WTA doubles ranking is No. 148, attained on 7 November 2016.

Career
Lim made her Grand Slam debut at the 2011 French Open, where she and her French partner Victoria Larrière had received a wildcard for the doubles main draw, and lost to the No. 6 seeds Bethanie Mattek-Sands and Meghann Shaughnessy, 2–6, 1–6, in the first round.

Lim made her Grand Slam singles debut at the 2014 French Open having received a wildcard, where she lost in the first round of the main draw to occasional training partner and then-world No. 1, Serena Williams, 2–6, 1–6.

Lim worked with Eurosport during the 2022 Australian Open, and presented their coverage of the event with Mats Wilander, Tim Henman, and Johanna Konta.

Personal life
Born in France, Lim is of Vietnamese descent through her father.

Grand Slam tournament performance timeline

Singles

ITF Circuit finals

Singles: 13 (3 titles, 10 runner–ups)

Doubles: 17 (6 titles, 11 runner–ups)

References

External links

 
 

1990 births
Living people
French female tennis players
French people of Vietnamese descent
Paris-Sorbonne University alumni
Tennis players from Paris